3C 295 is a narrow-line radio galaxy located in the constellation of Boötes. With a redshift of 0.464, it is approximately 5 billion light-years from Earth. At time of the discovery of its redshift in 1960, this was the remotest object known.

History
The number in its name corresponds with it being the 295th object in the Third Cambridge Catalogue of Radio Sources (which are ordered by right ascension). This is also where the prefix 3C came from.

The radio galaxy itself is a fairly normal small radio galaxy although unusually its hotspots are readily detected in optical and X-ray emission. The X-ray emission from the source is dominated by thermal emission from a rich cluster of galaxies. In optical images about 100 galaxies can be seen. 3C 295's cluster has enough material to create another 1,000 galaxies or more, making it one of the most massive objects in the known Universe. However, X-ray data showed that there is not enough mass to hold 3C 295 together gravitationally, which suggests the presence of dark matter.

References

External links
 
 www.jb.man.ac.uk/atlas/ (J. P. Leahy)

Radio galaxies
295
Boötes